Songgo Langit Waterfall is a waterfall located in Bucu, Kembang 30 miles north of downtown Jepara Regency, this waterfall has a height of 80 meters with a width of 2 meters. Surrounding this waterfall can be found a variety of Butterfly.

References

Tourism in Jepara
Waterfalls of Java
Landforms of Central Java